Margaret McTavish Konantz, née Rogers (April 30, 1899 – May 11, 1967) was a Canadian politician of Métis ancestry, who represented the electoral district of Winnipeg South in the House of Commons of Canada from 1963 to 1965. She was the first woman from Manitoba elected to the House of Commons.

Konantz was the daughter of Edith Rogers, the first woman ever elected to the Legislative Assembly of Manitoba, and Robert Arthur Rogers, a businessman. In 1922, Margaret married Gordon Konantz, the president of the North American Lumber Company, with whom she had three children: Barbara, Gordon, and William.

During World War II, Margaret Konantz was an active volunteer for the Patriotic Salvage Corps, Bundles for Britain and the Women's Volunteer Services. In 1944, she was one of four women sent to Great Britain by the Canadian government to work with the Women's Voluntary Service. She was awarded the Order of the British Empire posthumously for her volunteer work in the war effort. Following the death of her husband in 1954, she volunteered for UNICEF, travelling to Japan, Taiwan, Hong Kong, the Philippines, Thailand, Cambodia, India, Pakistan, Iraq, Lebanon, Jordan, Israel, Ghana, Nigeria, South Africa, Rhodesia, Tanzania, Kenya, Uganda, Ethiopia and the United Arab Republic on behalf of the organization.

She originally stood as the Liberal candidate for Winnipeg South in the 1962 election, but lost to Progressive Conservative incumbent Gordon Chown. When John Diefenbaker's minority government fell the following year, however, Konantz defeated Chown in the 1963 election. As the Liberals replaced the Tories as the governing party, she also served as a backbench supporter of the new prime minister Lester B. Pearson's government in the 26th Canadian Parliament. In 1964, she was the only woman on a committee of 15 MPs selected by Prime Minister Pearson to choose a new flag for Canada. She served as an MP until the 1965 election, when she was defeated by new Progressive Conservative candidate Bud Sherman.

Also in 1963, she was a delegate to the United Nations Third Committee on Social, Economic and Humanitarian Problems. In this capacity, she toured several Indian reserves in Canada to study economic and health conditions.

She became national chair for UNICEF Canada in 1965, and undertook several further international tours with the organization after leaving elected politics. She died on May 11, 1967, after collapsing of a heart attack at a radio station while preparing to conduct an interview about her UNICEF work.

References

External links
 
Margaret Konantz archives at the University of Manitoba

1899 births
1967 deaths
Members of the House of Commons of Canada from Manitoba
Liberal Party of Canada MPs
Politicians from Winnipeg
Women members of the House of Commons of Canada
Canadian humanitarians
Women humanitarians
Women in Manitoba politics
Women in the Canadian armed services
20th-century Canadian women politicians
20th-century Canadian politicians
Métis politicians
Members of the Junior League